Nowe Budy may refer to the following places:
Nowe Budy, Łódź Voivodeship (central Poland)
Nowe Budy, Nowy Dwór Mazowiecki County in Masovian Voivodeship (east-central Poland)
Nowe Budy, Wyszków County in Masovian Voivodeship (east-central Poland)
Nowe Budy, Żyrardów County in Masovian Voivodeship (east-central Poland)